The Himne de l'Exposició ("Anthem of the Exposition") or Himne de València ("Anthem of Valencia") is the official anthem of the Valencian Community, Spain. The song was composed by José Serrano Simeón with lyrics written by Maximiliano Thous Orts for the 1909 Valencian Regional Exhibition. The music is based on a 16th-century anthem dedicated to Saint George, who was the patron saint of the Kingdom of Valencia. It was approved by the mayors of Alicante, Castellón and Valencia in May 1925, and it was declared as the official anthem of the Valencian Community in 1981, with the approval of the Valencian Statute of Autonomy.

There has been some controversy over some of the words used. Some lines are considered as being too pro-Spain and some sectors of the community are pushing for an alternative tune, the Muixeranga, to be adopted instead. The Muixeranga has no lyrics, and hails from the local holidays of the town of Algemesí. However, the official anthem is widely used, especially during Falles celebrations, days celebrating Valencian patrimony, and any matches featuring the Valencian Community autonomous football team.

On 5 December 2008, a version both in Valencian and Spanish was sung and recorded by Plácido Domingo with the Orquestra de la Comunitat Valenciana. This updates the previous recording by Francisco.

Lyrics

Valencian

Spanish

See also 
 Anthems of the autonomous communities of Spain

Notes

Spanish anthems
Regional songs
Valencian culture
Catalan-language songs